Mystery religions, mystery cults, sacred mysteries or simply mysteries, were religious schools of the Greco-Roman world for which participation was reserved to initiates (mystai). The main characterization of this religion is the secrecy associated with the particulars of the initiation and the ritual practice, which may not be revealed to outsiders. The most famous mysteries of Greco-Roman antiquity were the Eleusinian Mysteries, which predated the Greek Dark Ages. The mystery schools flourished in Late Antiquity; Julian the Apostate in the mid 4th century is known to have been initiated into three distinct mystery schools—most notably the mithraists. Due to the secret nature of the school, and because the mystery religions of Late Antiquity were persecuted by the Christian Roman Empire from the 4th century, the details of these religious practices are derived from descriptions, imagery and cross-cultural studies. Much information on the Mysteries comes from Marcus Terentius Varro.

Justin Martyr in the 2nd century explicitly noted and identified them as "demonic imitations" of the true faith; "the devils, in imitation of what was said by Moses, asserted that Proserpine was the daughter of Jupiter, and instigated the people to set up an image of her under the name of Kore" (First Apology). Through the 1st to 4th century, Christianity stood in direct competition for adherents with the mystery schools, insofar as the "mystery schools too were an intrinsic element of the non-Jewish horizon of the reception of the Christian message". Beginning in the third century, and especially after Constantine became emperor, components of mystery religions began to be incorporated into mainstream Christian thinking, such as is reflected by the disciplina arcani.

Etymology

The English word 'mystery' originally appeared as the plural Greek Mystêria, and developed into the Latin mysterium where the English term originates. The etymology of the Greek mystêrion is not entirely clear, though scholars have traditionally thought it to have derived from the Greek myo, meaning "to close or shut" (chiefly referring to shutting the eyes, hence one who shuts their eyes and is initiated into the mysteries). Some Hittite scholars suggest that the Greek term derives from the Hittite verb munnae, "to conceal, to hide, to shut out of sight".

Characteristics
Mystery religions formed one of three types of Hellenistic religion, the others being the imperial cult, or the ethnic religion particular to a nation or state, and the philosophic religions such as Neoplatonism. 

This is also reflected in the tripartite division of "theology"—by Varro—into civil theology (concerning the state religion and its stabilizing effect on society), natural theology (philosophical speculation about the nature of the divine), and mythical theology (concerning myth and ritual).

Mysteries thus supplement rather than compete with civil religion. An individual could easily observe the rites of the state religion, be an initiate in one or more mysteries, and at the same time adhere to a certain philosophical school.  Many of the aspects of public religion such as sacrifices, ritual meals, and ritual purification were repeated within the mystery, but with the additional requirement that they take place in secrecy and be confined to a closed set of initiates. The mystery schools offered a niche for the preservation of ancient religious ritual, which was especially in demand by the time of the late Roman Empire, as cultic practices supported the established social and political orders instead of working against them; numerous early strands of Judaism and Christianity, for instance, appeared in opposition to such conditions, whereas the mystery cults, by their very nature, served to strengthen the status quo. 

For this reason, what evidence remains of the older Greek mysteries has been understood as reflecting certain archaic aspects of common Indo-European religion, with parallels in Indo-Iranian religion. The mystery schools of Greco-Roman antiquity include the Eleusinian Mysteries, the Dionysian Mysteries, and the Orphic Mysteries. Some of the many divinities that the Romans nominally adopted from other cultures also came to be worshipped in Mysteries; for instance, Egyptian Isis, Persian Mithras from the Mithraic Mysteries, Thracian/Phrygian Sabazius, and Phrygian Cybele.

Eleusinian Mysteries

The Eleusinian Mysteries were the earliest and most famous of the mystery cults and lasted for over a millennium. Whenever they first originated, by the end of the 5th century BC, they had been heavily influenced by Orphism, and in Late Antiquity, they had become allegorized.

Myth 
The basis for the Eleusinian Mysteries can be found in a myth concerning the kidnapping of Persephone, daughter of Demeter, the goddess of agriculture, by Hades, the god of the underworld, as told in the Homeric Hymns. Anguished by this event and wishing to persuade Zeus, the king of the gods, to allow the return of her daughter, Demeter caused famine and drought across the land, killing many and depriving the gods of proper sacrifice and worship. Eventually, Zeus permitted Persephone to rejoin her mother, prompting Demeter to end the pestilences which deprived the world of its prosperity. However, because the Fates decreed that whoever ate or drank in the underworld was doomed to spend eternity there, Persephone was still forced to remain in the realm for either four or six months of the year (depending on the telling), as she was tricked by Hades into eating pomegranate seeds of a corresponding amount. Thus, Demeter, in her sadness, neglects to nourish the earth for the months that Persephone is gone, only doing so when she returns, until the process repeats again. These episodic periods became the winter and spring seasons, with the “death” and “rebirth” of Persephone being allegorical for the cycle of life and the experience of all beings.

Initiation
In the 15th of the month of Boedromion (September/October) in the Attic calendar, as many as 3,000 potential initiates would have gathered in the agora of Athens, the gathering limited to those that spoke Greek and had never killed (as the emphasis on purity grew, this ban would include those who had "impure" souls). Like other large festivals such as the Diasia and Thesmophoria, the prospective initiates would bring their own sacrificial animals and hear the festivals proclamation as it began. The next day, they would have gone to the sea and purified themselves and the animals. Three days of rest would pass until the 19th, the agora was once more filled with the initiates at the procession at the sanctuary of Demeter and her daughter Persephone. Two Eleusinian priestesses were at the front of the procession followed by many Greeks holding special items in preparation for the rest of the ceremony, and the procession would leave the city on an hours-long 15-mile journey constantly interrupted by celebration, dances, etc, to the city of Eleusis. The initiates would carry torches on the way to the city. Once the city was reached, the pilgrims would dance into the sanctuary. The next day would begin with sacrifices, and at sunset, the initiates would go to a building called the telestêrion where the actual initiations would commence. The initiates washed themselves to be pure and everyone sat together in silence surrounded by the smell of extinguished torches. The initiation may have taken place over two nights. If so, the first night may have concerned the kidnapping of Persephone by Hades and ended with the goddess's return, whereas the second night concerned the epopteia (the higher degree of the Mysteries) which was a performance that included singing, dancing, potentially the showing of a phallus, a terrifying experience for the audience by the skilled Eleusinian clergy, and the climax of the event which must have included displaying a statue of Demeter and showing of an ear of wheat and a "birth" of agricultural wealth. Hence, these mysteries had associations with fertility and agriculture. In an attempt to solve the mystery of how so many people over the span of two millennia could have consistently experienced revelatory states during the culminating ceremony of the Eleusinian Mysteries, numerous scholars have proposed that the power of the Eleusinian Mysteries came from the kykeon's functioning as an entheogen.

Aftermath

The day of the completion of the initiation was called the Plemochoai (after a type of vessel used to conclude a libation), and the new members could now wear a myrtle wreath like the priests. Eventually, the initiates would leave and utter the phrases paks or konks, which referenced the proclamation of a conclusion of an event. The clothing worn by the new members during their journey were used as lucky blankets for children or perhaps were given to their sanctuary.

Samothracian Mysteries
The second most famous Mysteries were those on the island of Samothrace and promised safety to sailors from the perils of the sea, and most participants would come to be initiated from the neighboring regions. While the information here is even more scarce than that available with the Eleusinian Mysteries (and more late, dating to the Hellenistic and Roman periods), it's known that the Samothracian Mysteries significantly borrowed from the ones at Eleusis (including the word 'Mysteries'), furthermore, archaeological and linguistic data continues elucidating more of what happened at Samothrace. These rituals were also associated with others on neighboring island such as the mysteries of the deities of Cabeiri. Philip II of Macedon and his later wife Olympias were said to have met during the initiation ceremony at Samothrace. Heracles, Jason, Cadmus, Orpheus and the Dioscuri were all said to have been initiated here.

Myth 
Little is known about any core foundational myths for the entities worshipped by cult initiates at Samothrace; even their identities are unknown, as they tended to be discussed anonymously, being referred to as the "Samothracian gods" or the "Great Gods". This makes it difficult to reconstruct who they were, though comparisons between the "gods of Samothrace" and the Cabeiri, chthonic deities of an indeterminate amount (sometimes twins, or multiple distinct beings) from comparable, pre-Greek or entirely non-Greek cultures such as Thrace or Phrygia have been made. The similarities in regards to what each deity or set of deities were purported to offer - protection on the seas and help in difficult times - display a definite connection, though to what extent is impossible to conclude. It is therefore likely that if the Samothracian gods are not the Cabeiri themselves, elements from this comparative religion, along with Thracian elements of worship present on the island before an established Greek presence, heavily influenced the ideas and practices central to the mystery cult.

Initiation

Unlike at Eleusis, initiation at Samothrace was not restricted to a narrow few days of the year and lasted from April to November (the sailing season) with a large event likely taking place in June but may have taken place over two nights. Like in Samothrace, the future initiates would enter the sanctuary of Samothrace from the east where they would have entered into a 9-meter in diameter circular space with flagstones and a grandstand of five steps now called the Theatral Circle. Livy records that here, the initiates would listen to a proclamation concerning the absence of crime and bloodshed. Near the beginning of the rituals, like at Eleusis, sacrifices and libations were likely made, where the prospective animal for the sacrifice would have been a ram. The initiates would have moved to a building where the actual initiation took place at night with torches, though archaeologists are unsure of which building it was considering the abundance of possibilities including the Hall of Choral Dancers, the Hieron, the Anaktoron and the Rotunda of Arsinoe II. In the 3rd century, Hippolytus of Rome in his Refutation of All Heresies quotes a Gnostic author who provides a summary of some of the images here;

There stand two statues of naked men in the Anaktoron of the Samothracians, with both hands stretched up toward heaven and their pudenda turned up, just as the statue of Hermes at Kyllene. The aforesaid statues are images of the primal man and of the regenerated, spiritual man who is in every respect consubstantial with that man.

The scarcity of information precludes understanding what went on during the initiation, though there may have been dancing such as at Eleusis associated with the mythology of the search for Harmonia. At the end of the initiation, the initiates were given a purple fillet. There was also a second night of initiation, the epopteia where the "usual preliminary lustration rites and sacrifices" took place though not much else can be known besides that it may have been similar to the epopteia at Eleusis and would have climaxed with the showing of a great light.

Aftermath

The initiation of the first night was concluded by banqueting together and many dining rooms have been uncovered by archaeologists in association with the cult at Samothrace. The bowls used for the libation were also left behind, revealed by the thousands of discovered libation bowls at the cult sites. The participants occasionally left behind other materials, such as lamps. In addition to the purple fillet, they also left with a 'Samothracian ring' (magnetic iron ring coated in gold) and some initiates would set up a record of their initiation in the stoa of the sanctuary. The initiation of the second night was also concluded by a banquet.

Mithraic Mysteries 

Worship of the god Mithras was extremely popular among men of the Roman army for several centuries, originating in the 1st century BCE and ending with the persecution of non-Christian faiths within the Empire in the 4th century CE. Imported from Persia and adapted for Roman purposes like many other previously foreign deities, Mithras bears little relation to his Zoroastrian precursor, Mithra, retaining his Phrygian cap and garments, for instance, as a visual reminder of his eastern origins. The cultic acts of adherents were new and distinct, involving underground initiation rituals reserved exclusively for soldiers and complex, allegorical rites only vaguely understood today due to an absence of written sources. Feasting was the primary religious experience of initiated members, along with reenactments of core Mithraic imagery, such as the meal shared between the god Sol Invictus and Mithras, or the bearing of torches by men representing the twins of the rising and setting sun, Cautes and Cautopates.

Myth 

Traditionally, scholarship surrounding Mithras' mythological beginnings purport that followers believed the common image of the god emerging from a rock, already a young man, with a dagger in one hand and a torch in the other, was representative of his birth and nativity. New perspectives have appeared in light of continuous study which suppose that this scene instead displays the popular Roman religio-philosophical theme of ascent, whereby the god's emergence from the stone serves to depict his divinity and power over "earthly mundaneness". The visual and metaphorical components to the core cult image of Mithras slaying a bull, known as the tauroctony, have also been greatly debated. Propositions that the scene depicts nothing more than the act of sacrifice, well known to Romans through their civil religions and obligatory state festivals, have been accepted for some time, but belief that the scene displays a star-map of major constellations in addition to the usual action of sacrifice has appeared in recent years. As is the case with most other mystery religions, almost no written sources pertaining to the practices, much less the beliefs of adherents, survive. Thus, conjecture and assumption based almost exclusively on archaeological finds and modern interpretations provide only somewhat of a vague understanding.

Initiation 
A system of grades or levels was present in the hierarchical structure of Mithraic religion, the first of these being the rank of Corax (raven), followed by Nymphus or Gryphus (bridegroom), Miles (soldier), Leo (lion), Perses (Persian), Heliodromus (sun-runner), and finally Pater (father) as the highest. Though precise details are difficult to determine and certainly varied between locations, one general depiction of an initiation ritual at Capua has it that men were blindfolded and walked into the subterranean chamber known as a Mithraeum where the rites and practices of the cult would be performed. Initiates were naked, bound with their arms behind them, and kneeled before a priest, whereupon they would be released from their bondage, crowned, but not permitted to rise until a particular moment. The initiation was confirmed by a handshake, as members would henceforth be referred to as syndexioi, or those "united by the handshake". Little is known about the cult's practices subsequent to initiation, as the highly secretive nature of the religion as well as a substantial absence of written texts makes it difficult to determine what precisely took place in regular meetings, beyond the payment of a membership fee.

Other mystery schools
 Cult of Despoina– An Arcadian cult worshipping a goddess who was believed to be the daughter of Poseidon and Demeter.
 Cult of Attis– A Greek cult that was not followed in Rome until its early days as an empire. It followed the Story of Attis, a godlike figure who was eventually killed by a boar sent by Zeus.
 Cults of Cybele– A number of cults following Cybele, or Magna Mater, were present in Greece, Anatolia, and Rome. This cult followed Cybele, which was an Anatolian "mother goddess". However, after it became present in Rome, the Romans reinvented Cybele as a Trojan goddess. In Rome, the cults of Cybele were often restricted and gained few members because of strictures against castration, which was considered a ritual necessary for initiation. This was later replaced with animal sacrifice, but numbers were still limited. 
 Mysteries of Isis– This was a rather present and more well-known cult. While most of the mystery cults revolved around Hellenistic culture and religion, the cults of Isis worshipped the Egyptian goddess of wisdom and magic. It emerged during the Hellenistic Era (323 BCE through 30 CE).
Jupiter Dolichenus– Roman reimagining of a foreign, "oriental" deity comparable to the head Olympian figure, Jupiter.
 Cult of Trophonius– A Hellenistic cult surrounding a minor god/hero. A number of people went to his temples to receive an oracle.
 Dionysian Mysteries– This was a small cult with unknown origins. It is believed to have pre-dated Greece and possibly originated from Crete or North Africa. Its rituals were based on a theme of seasonal life and rebirth.
 Orphism– Another of the more famous mystery cults, this cult followed the story of Orpheus, a mythical poet who descended to the underworld and back. The Orphic Mysteries' worship centered around the god Dionysus and his dual role as a god of death and rebirth, supposedly as revealed by Orpheus.
 Cult of Sabazios– This cult worshipped a nomadic horseman god called Sabazios. He was a Thracian/Phrygian god, but the Greeks and Romans syncretized him with Zeus/Jupiter and Dionysus.
 Cult of Serapis– A cult following the Greco-Egyptian god Serapis. He and his cult gained a decent amount of popularity in Rome, causing him to replace Osiris as the consort of Isis outside of Egypt. He was worshipped in processions and sanctuaries.

Possible influence on early Christianity
Towards the end of the 19th century and beginning of the 20th century, it was becoming more popular in German scholarship to connect the origins of Christianity with heavy influence from the mystery cults, if not labeling Christianity itself as a mystery cult. This trend was partly the result of the increasing growth of critical historical analysis of Christianity's history, as exemplified by David Strauss's Das Leben Jesu (1835–36) and the secularizing trend among scholars that sought to derive Christianity from its pagan surroundings. Scholars, for example, began attempting to derive Paul's theology from a Mithraic mystery cult in Tarsus, even though no mystery cult existed there nor did a Mithraic mystery cult exist before the end of the 1st century. The attitudes of scholars began to change as Egyptology continued emerging as a discipline and a seminal article published by Arthur Nock in 1952 that noted the near absence of mystery terminology in the New Testament. While some have tried to tie the origins of rites in Christianity such as baptism and the Eucharist to mystery religions, it has been demonstrated that the origins of baptism rather lie in Jewish purificatory ritual and that cult meals were so widespread in the ancient world that attempting to demonstrate their origins from any one source is arbitrary. Searches for Christianity deriving content from mystery religions has also been unsuccessful; many of them (such as the mysteries of Eleusis and Samothrace) had no content but rather limited themselves to showing objects in initiation.

Later interaction between Christianity and mystery religions did take place. Christianity has its own initiation ritual, baptism, and beginning in the fourth century, Christians began to refer to their sacraments, such as baptism, with the word mysterion, the Greek term that was also used for a mystery rite. In this case, the word meant that Christians did not discuss their most important rites with non-Christians who might misunderstand or disrespect them. Their rites thus acquired some of the aura of secrecy that surrounded the mystery cults.

Even in ancient times these similarities were controversial. Non-Christians in the Roman Empire in the early centuries CE, such as Lucian and Celsus, thought Christianity and the mystery cults resembled each other. Reacting to these claims by outsiders, early Christian apologists, such as Justin Martyr, denied that these cults had influenced their religion. The seventeenth-century Protestant scholar Isaac Casaubon brought up the issue again by accusing the Catholic Church of deriving its sacraments from the rituals of the mystery cults. Charles-François Dupuis, in the late eighteenth century, went further by claiming that Christianity itself sprang from the mystery cults. Intensified by religious disputes between Protestants, Catholics, and non-Christians, the controversy has continued to the present day.

See also
 Bacchanalia
 Dianic Wicca
 Discordianism
 Mysticism
 Navigium Isidis

References

Bibliography

Blakely, Sandra (2018). Starry Twins and Mystery Rites: From Samothrace to Mithras. Acta Antiqua Academiae Scientiarum Hungaricae, 58(1-4). .

 
 

 
Keller, M.L. (1988). The Eleusinian Mysteries of Demeter and Persephone: Fertility, Sexuality, and Rebirth. Journal of Feminist Studies in Religion, 4(1).
Leonard, Benjamin (2021). Secret Rites of Samothrace. Archaeology, 74(5).
Martin, L.H. (2021). Seeing the Mithraic Tauroctony, Numen, 68(4).
 
Rives, J.B. (2010). Graeco-Roman Religion in the Roman Empire: Old Assumptions and New Approaches. Currents in Biblical Research, 8(2).

Further reading
 Aneziri, Sophia. Die Vereine der Dionysischen Techniten im Kontext der hellenistischen Gesellschaft (Stuttgart, 2003).
 
 Casadio, Giovanni Casadio and Johnston, Patricia A. (eds), Mystic Cults in Magna Graecia (Austin, TX, University of Texas Press, 2009).

External links